Muhammad Zubair Khan Baloch is a Pakistani politician who was a Member of the Provincial Assembly of the Punjab, from August 2013 to May 2018.

Early life
He was born on 10 February 1987.

He completed his intermediate level education in 2004 from Sadiq Public School.

Political career

He was elected to the Provincial Assembly of the Punjab as a candidate of Pakistan Muslim League (Nawaz) from Constituency PP-210 (Lodhran-IV) in by-polls held in August 2013.

References

Living people
Punjab MPAs 2013–2018
1987 births
Pakistan Muslim League (N) politicians